Harald Troch (born ) is a member of parliament in Social Democratic Party in Austria.

References

Social Democratic Party of Austria politicians
1959 births
Living people